This is a list of winners and nominees of the Primetime Emmy Award for Outstanding Music Composition for a Documentary Series or Special.

The category was created in 2019. Documentary programs previously competed for the Primetime Emmy Award for Outstanding Music Composition for a Limited Series, Movie, or Special.

Winners and nominations

2010s

2020s

Multiple nominations

2 nominations
Miriam Cutler
Steven Price

References

Film music awards
Music Composition for a Documentary Series or Special